Novi Grad is a small settlement in the Municipality of Sevnica in central Slovenia. It lies in the hills south of Vrhovo. The area is part of the historical region of Lower Carniola and is now included in the Lower Sava Statistical Region.

References

External links
Novi Grad at Geopedia

Populated places in the Municipality of Sevnica